Hkengnang is a village in Mawkmai Township, Loilen District, in the Shan State of eastern Burma.  It is a primarily agricultural village with fields surrounding it in an otherwise remote, heavily forested area. It lies north of Mak and northwest of Wān Long.

References

External links
Maplandia World Gazetteer

Populated places in Loilen District
Mawkmai Township